Taiwanese singer Ella Chen has released one studio album and three Extended plays. She is a member of the Taiwanese girl-group S.H.E, and released her debut solo album, Why Not, in 2015.

Albums

Studio albums

Extended plays

Singles

Collaborations

Soundtracks

References

Chen, Ella
Chen, Ella
Discography